Balder Dead is a narrative poem with powerful tragic themes, first published in 1855 by Matthew Arnold. This poem draws upon Norse mythology: retelling the story of the murder of Odin's son, Balder, as brought about by the wicked machinations of Loki, blood brother to Odin.

Synopsis
The evil Loki was quickly punished for murdering Balder by being exiled from Asgard. Still, it remains for the gods - the Æsir and the Vanir dwelling in Asgard - to bury and to mourn their dead.

Partly out of desperate grief - and partly in defiance of the harshness of the Norns or fates: Odin begs Hermod to ride his own steed, Sleipnir, down to Hell and beg Hela to release Balder. Hermod executes the seemingly hopeless task: and receives from Hela the unexpected promise that she would release Balder should everything in the upper worlds mourn Balder's death. Before returning to Asgard, Hermod speaks with Balder's shade: Balder warns him that Hela's "promises" are never what they seem - and will only bear  bitter fruit. Loki himself undertakes to frustrate the Æsir's hopes: appearing as an ugly hag in Middle Earth, he refuses to mourn for Balder - thus breaking Hela's stipulated conditions.

Hermod returns to Hell to acquaint Balder with the gods' failure. Balder accepts what has happened without surprise, and they soon part: after Balder relates his vision of the end of the worlds in the approaching conflagration of Ragnarök.

References

External links
Balder Dead - from the Internet Archive
 

1855 poems
Baldr
Norse mythology in art and literature
Poetry by Matthew Arnold